The Baker Street Boys is a British television series made by the BBC and first shown in 1983. The series recounts the adventures of a gang of street urchins living in Victorian London who assist the legendary detective Sherlock Holmes in solving crimes and find themselves tackling cases of their own.

Production
Anthony Read planned out the show's format. Read had previously been a script editor and writer on the 1965 Sherlock Holmes series starring Douglas Wilmer. He claimed to have long wondered what the Irregulars got up to when not in the service of Sherlock Holmes and the series deals with this subject.
 
Although Holmes was always absent (explained on-screen by his being too busy working on another case, being held captive by Professor Moriarty, or confined to bed by illness), Dr. Watson was always around to assist the Irregulars when necessary.

Holmes was only ever seen obliquely (Roger Ostime provided the character's voice) while Dr. Watson, Inspector Lestrade and Mrs. Hudson all featured more prominently.

The part of Professor Moriarty was portrayed by Colin Jeavons, who would later go on to play Inspector Lestrade in the acclaimed Granada adaptation.

Cast

Starring
Jay Simpson as Wiggins
Damion Napier as Beaver
Adam Woodyatt as Shiner
David Garlick as Sparrow
Debbie Norris as Queenie
Suzi Ross as Rosie

Recurring
Roger Ostime as Sherlock Holmes (voice only)
Hubert Rees as Dr. Watson
Stanley Lebor as Inspector Lestrade
Pat Keen as Mrs. Hudson
Colin Jeavons as Professor James Moriarty

Episodes
Eight episodes were broadcast:

VHS release
In 1985, the BBC released 4 episodes from the series on VHS video. They were edited into two 48-minute-long episodes.

The two stories featured were "The Adventure of the Disappearing Dispatch Case" (from Episodes 1 and 2) and "The Adventure of the Winged Scarab" (from Episodes 5 and 6).

Books
Seven books based on the TV series have been published to date:

See also
 Baker Street Irregulars
 221B Baker Street (video game)

References

External links
 

BBC children's television shows
Period television series
Sherlock Holmes television series
1980s British children's television series
1983 British television series debuts
1983 British television series endings
1980s British mystery television series